Güçlükonak District is a district of the Şırnak Province of Turkey. In 2021, the district had a population of 11,915. The seat of the district is the town of Güçlükonak.

The district was part of Siirt Province until it was attached to Şırnak Province in 1990.

Settlements 
Güçlükonak District contains two beldes, twenty-five villages, of which six are unpopulated, and moreover ten hamlets.

Beldes 

 Güçlükonak
 Fındık

Villages 

 Ağaçyurdu
 Akçakuşak
 Akdizgin
 Boyuncuk
 Bulmuşlar
 Çetinkaya
 Çevrimli
 Çobankazanı
 Dağyeli
 Damlabaşı
 Damlarca
 Demirboğaz
 Düğünyurdu
 Erdurdu
 Eskiyapı
 Kırkağaç
 Koçtepe
 Ormaniçi
 Özbaşoğlu
 Sağkol
 Taşkonak
 Yağızoymak
 Yağmurkuyusu
 Yatağankaya
 Yenidemir

References 

Districts of Şırnak Province
States and territories established in 1990